Al Diwaniyah ( ad-Dīwānīyah), also spelt Diwaniya, is the capital city of Iraq's Al-Qādisiyyah Governorate.  In 2002 the population was estimated at 440,927.

Overview
The area around Al Diwaniyah, which is well irrigated from the nearby Euphrates river, is often considered to be one on the most fertile parts of Iraq, and is heavily cultivated.  The town is located on the main rail transport corridor between Baghdad and Basra in south-central Iraq.

For birdwatchers, Al-Diwaniyah is a city with a rich bird list, as the city has a wide range of biodiversity. Al-Qadisiyah consists of vast agricultural areas, wetlands, arid zones, and semi-desert areas.

The city is the site of a tire manufacturing plant that once provided tires for much of Iraq. The plant is still active as of 2008.

Al-Diwaniyah is the headquarters of the Iraqi Army's 8th Division (Iraq).

Climate 
Al Diwaniyah has a hot desert climate (BWh) in the Köppen–Geiger climate classification system.

Gallery

See also
 List of places in Iraq
Battle of Diwaniya

References

External links 

Diwaniyah
Populated places on the Euphrates River
Cities in Iraq